Gert Van Walle  (born 7 August 1987) is a Belgian male volleyball player. He was part of the Belgium men's national volleyball team at the 2014 FIVB Volleyball Men's World Championship in Poland. He played for Altotevere Città di Castello and French club Beauvais.

References

External links
Player Profile in World Championship 2014
Player profile in 2015 FIVB World League
Career in Legavolley

1987 births
Living people
Belgian men's volleyball players
Sportspeople from Antwerp
People from Ekeren
Belgian expatriate sportspeople in France
Belgian expatriate sportspeople in Italy
Belgian expatriate sportspeople in Poland
Expatriate volleyball players in France
Expatriate volleyball players in Italy
Expatriate volleyball players in Poland